Scaeva dignota is a European species of hoverfly.

References

Diptera of Europe
Syrphinae
Insects described in 1857
Taxa named by Camillo Rondani